Starodrachenino is a rural locality (a selo) and the administrative center of Starodracheninsky Selsoviet, Zarinsky District, Altai Krai, Russia. The population was 572 as of 2013. There are 11 streets.

Geography 
Starodrachenino is located 17 km southeast of Zarinsk (the district's administrative centre) by road. Komarskoye is the nearest rural locality.

References 

Rural localities in Zarinsky District